The Vietnamese American Armed Forces Association (abbreviated: VAAFA), (Vietnamese: Hội Quân Nhân Người Mỹ Gốc Việt), is a non-profit, non partisan professional military association. It is the first military association for Vietnamese American service members in the United States.  Its members are Active, Reserve, National Guard, and Veterans of the U.S Armed Forces; Enlisted and Commissioned Officers from the five branches of the U.S. Military; U.S. Army, U.S. Marine Corps, U.S. Navy, U.S. Air Force, and U.S. Coast Guard and the two noncombatant uniformed services the National Oceanic and Atmospheric Administration Commissioned Corps (NOAAC) and the United States Public Health Service Commissioned Corps (PHSCC).

Mission

VAAFA's stated mission is to provide professional development, mentorship, enhanced camaraderie, and networking for current and former Vietnamese American service members of the seven uniformed services.  Through fund raising events and activities, the association raises money to provide care packages for deployed service members as well as provide financial assistances to families; in order for a member travel to the location of care in the event a military service member is wounded in the line of duty. VAAFA, also seeks to raise awareness of the contribution and sacrifices of Vietnamese American in the U.S. Armed Forces through active engagement of the Vietnamese Community through participation in community events and activities. As a military association, it does not endorse any political groups or activities. In 2010, VAAFA established the Fallen Heroes Scholarship, for 12 U.S. Citizen or Permanent Resident Vietnamese American students currently enrolled in college or high school seniors.  The Fallen Heroes Scholarship was established in memory of Vietnamese American military service members who have died in defense of the United States of America.

History

In the Spring of 2007, Lieutenant Commander Christopher V. Phan, Judge Advocate General's Corps, U.S. Navy, was deployed with the U.S. Navy SEAL to Iraq.  He and several of the SEALs were trying to arrange a flight out of Baghdad when Lieutenant Colonel Tho V. Nguyen, U.S. Army, overheard LCDR Phan speaking at the reservation counter.  
 
The men struck up a conversation on the air field and made a commitment that they would stay in touch upon redeployment to the States.
 
True to their words, LCDR Phan and LTC Nguyen remained friends after their deployment.  They both knew and experienced the loneliness of serving overseas in harm's way and being far from their families.  They wanted to establish an association in order to assist all Vietnamese American service members and their families to cope with the separation and loneliness.
 
LCDR Phan and LTC Nguyen, along with Sergeant Thao Bui, U.S. Army, Captain Triet Bui, U.S. Army, and Captain Hien Vu, U.S. Air Force, met at Captain Bui's home and began drafting the by-laws and article of association for the Vietnamese American Armed Forces Association (VAAFA) on August 23, 2008.
 
VAAFA received official recognition from the State of California on September 15, 2008.  The association held its installation banquet on May 31, 2009.  VAAFA's membership is growing and the association hopes to reach and serve all Vietnamese American service members, their families, and the Vietnamese American community.

Past Events

05/31/09 – Vietnamese American Memorial – Orange County, CA

05/31/09 – Installation Banquet – Orange County, CA

09/6/09  – First Bi-Annual Conference – Coronado, CA

09/26/09 – First Annual Care Package Donation Drive – Orange County, San Jose, CA

09/27/09 – First Annual Care Package Donation Drive – San Diego, CA

11/22/09 – A Gift From The Heart Donation Drive – Orange County, CA

11/26/09 – Alta Gardens Care Center Thanksgiving Day Visit – Orange County, CA

12/13/09 – Toy Distribution – Orange County, CA

12/19/09 – Toy Distribution – San Jose, CA

02/14/10 – Alta Gardens Care Center Tet Visit – Orange County, CA

03/05/10 – Fallen Heroes Scholarship Fundraiser Banquet – Orange County, CA

Fallen Vietnamese American Service Members

TSGT Thanh V. Nguyen, USAF, June 25, 1996, Saudi Arabia
LCPL Alan D. Lam, USMC, April 22, 2003, Iraq
LCPL Andrew S. Dang, USMC, May 22, 2004, Iraq
SPC Binh Q. Tran, USA, November 7, 2004, Iraq
LCPL Victor Ronald H. Lu, USMC, November 13, 2004, Iraq  
CPL Binh N. Le, USMC, December 3, 2004, Iraq
SFC Tung M. Nguyen, USA, November 14, 2006, Iraq
SSGT Du H. Tran, USA, June 20, 2008, Iraq
PFC Tan Q. Ngo, USA, August 27, 2008, Afghanistan
SGT Long N. Nguyen, USA, February 10, 2007, Afghanistan
SPC Dan H. Nguyen, USA, May 8, 2007, Iraq
CPL Tevan L. Nguyen, USMC, December 28, 2010, Afghanistan

References

External links
 Official Page
 VAAFA YouTube Videos
 Viet Bao Newspaper article on VAAFA

American military personnel of Asian descent
American veterans' organizations
2008 establishments in California
Overseas Vietnamese organizations in the United States
Organizations established in 2008
Non-profit organizations based in California
United States military support organizations
American military personnel
Overseas Vietnamese organizations
Vietnamese emigrants to the United States